Samastipur is a city and a municipal corporation (nagar nigam) in Bihar, India. It is the headquarter of Samastipur district and comes under Darbhanga division. The Budhi Gandak river flows through the town. It is one of the five railway divisions of ECR, Hajipur. The Samastipur junction is one of the busiest station in North Bihar after Patna and Katihar.

Demographics
As of 2011 Indian Census, Samastipur had a total population of 62,935, of which 33,025 were males and 29,910 were females. Population within the age group of 0 to 6 years was 8,252. The total number of literates in Samastipur was 46,416, which constituted 73.8% of the population with male literacy of 77.2% and female literacy of 69.9%. The effective literacy rate of 7+ population of Samastipur was 84.9%, of which male literacy rate was 88.9% and female literacy rate was 80.4%. The Scheduled Castes and Scheduled Tribes population was 9,219 and 249 respectively. Samastipur had 12062 households in 2011.

Education
Samastipur has several schools and colleges. Most of the colleges are affiliated to the Lalit Narayan Mithila University, Darbhanga.

The Dr. Rajendra Prasad Central Agriculture University, is located near the town, in Pusa. This university was constructed in 1970 near the ruins of Pusa Institute which was the Indian Agricultural Research Institute built during the British regime.

IGNOU has several study centres in Samastipur.

Transport

Road 
Bihar State Road Transport Corporation (B.S.R.T.C) operates bus services to the neighbouring states of Jharkhand, West Bengal and Uttar Pradesh.

Rail 
Samastipur Junction railway station lies in the East Central Railway zone of the Indian Railway network and provides connectivity to most of the regions of India.

Notable people

 Bali Ram Bhagat, 6th Speaker of Lok Sabha, Governor of Rajasthan, Governor of Himachal Pradesh and former Member of parliament
 Gajendra Prasad Himanshu, politician
 Syed Shahnawaz Hussain, Indian politician, national spokesperson of Bharatiya Janata Party and a cabinet minister
 N. Mandal, Indian film director, editor and producer 
 Anukul Roy, Indian cricketer
 Shilpa Singh, Indian singer, dancer, model and beauty pageant titleholder
 Vivekanand Sinha , Inspector General of Police, Bastar range, Chhattisgarh.
 Karpoori Thakur, politician and independence activist

Villages
 

Kaina
Uda patti is one of the oldest villages of Samastipur.

References

 
Cities and towns in Samastipur district